Goatlord may refer to:
 Baphomet, a satanic deity
 Goatlord (band), a U.S. black/death/doom metal band
 Goatlord (album), an  album by black metal band Darkthrone